Theodor "Theoz" Haraldsson (born 17 July 2005) is a Swedish singer and actor. He started his career by posting videos to Musical.ly in 2016 with the name Theoz. In 2020, he had a leading role in the movie  opposite Robert Gustafsson. Theoz participated in Melodifestivalen 2022 with the song "".

Discography

EPs

Singles

References

External links
 

2005 births
Living people
Melodifestivalen contestants of 2023
Melodifestivalen contestants of 2022